The year 1965 in film involved several significant events, with The Sound of Music topping the U.S. box office and winning five Academy Awards.

Top-grossing films (U.S.)

The top ten 1965 released films by box office gross in North America are as follows:

Events
 February 15 – George Stevens' production of The Greatest Story Ever Told, a retelling of the account of Jesus Christ, premieres in New York City, New York. It was such a flop with critics and audiences that its failure discouraged production of religious epics for many years. It is considered notable in the 21st century for its astonishing landscapes, powerful and provocative cinematography, Max von Sydow's debut acting performance in an American film, and the final film performance of Claude Rains.
 March 2 – The Rodgers and Hammerstein film adaptation of The Sound of Music, directed by Robert Wise and starring Julie Andrews and Christopher Plummer, premieres. It quickly became a worldwide phenomenon and an instant classic. It successfully displaced Gone with the Wind to become, at the time, the highest-grossing film of all-time. The Sound of Music is credited as the film that saved and restored Twentieth Century-Fox from bankruptcy after it suffered from extremely high production costs of Cleopatra two years prior.
 July 1 – Blake Edwards's epic comedy The Great Race, starring Tony Curtis, Jack Lemmon, Natalie Wood, Peter Falk, and Keenan Wynn, premieres. Initially a flop with critics and audiences, some do admire Edwards' direction, the acting by its ensemble cast, Henry Mancini's music and its climactic pie fight.
August 10 - A massive vault fire at MGM studios in Culver City, California, destroys the only known copies of hundreds of archived silent films, including Lon Chaney's London After Midnight and Greta Garbo's The Divine Woman.
 December 22 – David Lean's film adaptation of Boris Pasternak's Doctor Zhivago, starring Omar Sharif, Julie Christie, Rod Steiger, and Alec Guinness, premieres and, like The Sound of Music, quickly became a worldwide phenomenon. Its moral story and message of a love and human spirit that defied the communist Soviet Union have made the film a true classic with critics and audiences. It was included among top films by the American Film Institute. In a decade of very difficult times for its studio, Zhivago became the most successful and acclaimed Metro-Goldwyn-Mayer film since How the West Was Won; it was the greatest MGM film since Ben-Hur.

Awards
Academy Awards:
 
Best Picture: The Sound of Music – Argyle Enterprises, 20th Century Fox
Best Director: Robert Wise – The Sound of Music
Best Actor: Lee Marvin – Cat Ballou
Best Actress: Julie Christie – Darling
Best Supporting Actor: Martin Balsam – A Thousand Clowns
Best Supporting Actress: Shelley Winters – A Patch of Blue
Best Foreign Language Film: The Shop on Main Street (Obchod na korze), directed by Ján Kadár and Elmar Klos, Czechoslovakia

BAFTA Film Awards:

Best Film from Any Source: My Fair Lady
Best British Film: The Ipcress File

Golden Globe Awards:

Drama:
Best Picture: Doctor Zhivago
Best Actor: Omar Sharif – Doctor Zhivago
Best Actress: Samantha Eggar – The Collector
 
Comedy or Musical:
Best Picture: The Sound of Music
Best Actor: Lee Marvin – Cat Ballou
Best Actress: Julie Andrews – The Sound of Music

Other
Best Supporting Actor: Oskar Werner – The Spy Who Came in from the Cold
Best Supporting Actress: Ruth Gordon – Inside Daisy Clover
Best Director: David Lean – Doctor Zhivago

Palme d'Or (Cannes Film Festival):
The Knack ...and How to Get It, directed by Richard Lester, United Kingdom

Golden Lion (Venice Film Festival):
Vaghe stelle dell'Orsa (Sandra of a Thousand Delights), directed by Luchino Visconti, Italy

Golden Bear (Berlin Film Festival):
Alphaville, directed by Jean-Luc Godard, France / Italy

1965 film releases
United States unless stated

January–March
January 1965
January 8
Dear Brigitte
January 15
Baby the Rain Must Fall
January 28
36 Hours
February 1965
February 10
Strange Bedfellows
Sylvia
February 15
Lord Jim UK)
February 23
Dr. Terror's House of Horrors UK)
February 24
Love Has Many Faces
Crack in the World
March 1965
March 2
The Sound of Music
March 5
Face of the Screaming Werewolf
The Rounders
March 6
Empire
Nightmare in the Sun
March 15
Major Dundee
March 21
Die! Die! My Darling! (U.K.)
March 24
John Goldfarb, Please Come Home!
March 31
The Truth About Spring

April–June
April 1965
April 3
The Man from Button Willow
April 6
In Harm's Way
April 7
Bus Riley's Back in Town
Girl Happy
April 8
The World of Abbott and Costello
April 9
The Greatest Story Ever Told
April 14
Beach Blanket Bingo
The Satan Bug
May 1965
5 May
Alphaville France)
Brainstorm
7 May
Joy in the Morning
13 May
The Yellow Rolls-Royce
14 May
Harlow
26 May
Mirage
June 1965
June 2
What's New Pussycat?
June 3
Shenandoah
June 9
Up from the Beach French international co-production
June 16
Those Magnificent Men in Their Flying Machines
June 18
I'll Take Sweden
June 23
Genghis Khan (1965 film) 
The Hallelujah Trail
Harlow
Von Ryan's Express
Willy McBean and his Magic Machine
June 24
Cat Ballou
June 30
Ski Party
Tickle Me

July–September
July 1965
July 1
The Family Jewels
The Great Race
The Sons of Katie Elder
July 3
The Hill (UK)
July 12
The Art of Love
July 14
How to Stuff a Wild Bikini
July 21
I Saw What You Did
July 22
The Amorous Adventures of Moll Flanders
July 29
Ship of Fools
August 1965
August 1
Voyage to the Prehistoric Planet
August 3
Darling (UK)
You Must Be Joking! (UK)
August 8
Frankenstein Conquers the World (Japan)
August 9
The Brigand of Kandahar
August 14
A Very Special Favor
August 18
Catch Us If You Can (UK)
The Monkey's Uncle
Sergeant Deadhead
August 23
Dr. Who and the Daleks (U.K.)
August 25
Morituri
That Funny Feeling
Wild on the Beach
September 1965
September 1
Billie
September 3
The Battle of the Villa Fiorita (UK)
September 8
Operation C.I.A.
September 15
The Reward
September 20
How to Murder Your Wife
September 24
Marriage on the Rocks
September 27
Mickey One

October–December
October 1965
October 6
Who Killed Teddy Bear
October 7
The Agony and the Ecstasy
October 11
The Bedford Incident (US/UK)
October 13
Situation Hopeless... But Not Serious
October 15
The Cincinnati Kid
October 17
Sting of Death
October 27
King Rat
November 1965
November 4
Never Too Late
November 6
Dr. Goldfoot and the Bikini Machine
November 10
The War Lord
November 15
Bunny Lake Is Missing (UK)
November 18
For a Few Dollars More (Italy)
November 19
Return from the Ashes
November 24
Harum Scarum
November 25
Lady L
November 26
Carry On Cowboy UK)
November 27
Gamera, the Giant Monster (Japan)
December 1965
December 2
That Darn Cat! 
December 8
The Return of Ringo (Italy)
December 10
A Patch of Blue
December 13
A Thousand Clowns
December 15
The Flight of the Phoenix
December 16
Battle of the Bulge
The Spy Who Came in from the Cold UK)
December 19
Invasion of Astro-Monster
December 22
Doctor Zhivago (UK/Italy/US)
December 23
The Slender Thread
December 24
Bad Girls Go to Hell
December 29
Thunderball (UK/US)

Notable films released in 1965
United States unless stated

#
The 10th Victim (La decima vittima), starring Marcello Mastroianni and Ursula Andress – (Italy/France)
36 Hours, starring James Garner, Rod Taylor and Eva Marie Saint
The 317th Platoon (La 317ème section), written and directed by Pierre Schoendoerffer – (France)

A
Abashiri Prison (Abashiri Bangaichi), starring Ken Takakura – (Japan)
Adventures of a Dentist (Pokhozhdyeniya zubnovo vracha), directed by Elem Klimov – (U.S.S.R.)
The Adventures of the Smurfs (Les aventures des Schtroumpfs) – (Belgium)
The Agony and the Ecstasy, directed by Carol Reed, starring Charlton Heston and Rex Harrison
The Alphabet Murders, directed by Frank Tashlin, starring Tony Randall and Anita Ekberg
Alphaville (Alphaville, une étrange aventure de Lemmy Caution), directed by Jean-Luc Godard – (France)
Always Further On (Tarahumara (Cada vez más lejos)), directed by Luis Alcoriza – (Mexico)
The Amorous Adventures of Moll Flanders, starring Kim Novak, Richard Johnson and Angela Lansbury
The Art of Love, directed by Norman Jewison, starring James Garner, Angie Dickinson, Elke Sommer and Dick Van Dyke
Arzoo (Wish), starring Sadhana – (India)
The Ashes (Popioły), directed by Andrzej Wajda – (Poland)

B
Baby the Rain Must Fall, starring Steve McQueen and Lee Remick
Bad Girls Go to Hell, directed by Doris Wishman
Battle of the Bulge, starring Henry Fonda, Robert Shaw and Robert Ryan
The Battle of the Villa Fiorita, directed by Delmer Daves, starring Maureen O'Hara, Rossano Brazzi, Olivia Hussey
Beach Blanket Bingo, directed by William Asher, starring Annette Funicello, Frankie Avalon, Deborah Walley, Don Rickles
The Bedford Incident, starring Richard Widmark and Sidney Poitier – (US/UK)
Behind the Mask of Zorro, directed by Ricardo Blasco and starring Tony Russel – (Italy/Spain)
Billie, directed by Don Weis and starring Patty Duke
Black Humor, anthology film directed by Claude Autant-Lara, Giancarlo Zagni and José María Forqué – (France/Italy/Spain)
Black Wind (Viento negro), directed by Servando González – (Mexico)
Boeing Boeing, starring Jerry Lewis and Tony Curtis
La Bohème, directed by Franco Zeffirelli – (West Germany)
Brainstorm, directed by William Conrad, starring Anne Francis and Jeffrey Hunter
The Brigand of Kandahar, starring Oliver Reed and Yvonne Romain
Bunny Lake Is Missing, directed by Otto Preminger, starring Laurence Olivier and Carol Lynley – (U.K.)
Bus Riley's Back in Town, starring Ann-Margret and Michael Parks

C
The Camp Followers (Le soldatesse), starring Anna Karina – (Italy)
Carry On Cowboy, starring Sid James, Kenneth Williams, Jim Dale – (U.K.)
Casanova 70, starring Marcello Mastroianni and Virna Lisi – (Italy)
Cat Ballou, starring Jane Fonda and Lee Marvin
Catch Us If You Can (a.k.a. Having a Wild Weekend), starring the Dave Clark Five – (U.K.)
China!, a documentary written by Felix Greene
Chronicle of a Boy Alone (Crónica de un niño solo) – (Argentina)
The Cincinnati Kid, directed by Norman Jewison, starring Steve McQueen, Edward G. Robinson, Ann-Margret, Karl Malden, Tuesday Weld, Joan Blondell
City Under the Sea (a.k.a. War-Gods of the Deep), starring Vincent Price and Tab Hunter
Clarence, the Cross-Eyed Lion, starring Marshall Thompson and Betsy Drake
Cloportes (La aétamorphose des cloportes), directed by Pierre Granier-Deferre – (France/Italy)
Coast of Skeletons, directed by Robert Lynn and starring Richard Todd and Dale Robertson – (U.K./South Africa)
The Collector, directed by William Wyler, starring Terence Stamp and Samantha Eggar – (U.K./U.S.)
Crack in the World, starring Dana Andrews, Kieron Moore, Janette Scott
Cup Fever, starring Bernard Cribbins – (U.K.)
Curse of the Fly, starring Brian Donlevy, George Baker, Carole Gray
Curse of the Voodoo (a.k.a. Curse of Simba / Voodoo Blood Death), directed by Lindsay Shonteff – (U.K.)

D
Darling, directed by John Schlesinger, starring Laurence Harvey, Dirk Bogarde, Julie Christie – (U.K.)
Dear Brigitte, starring James Stewart, Bill Mumy, Glynis Johns, Ed Wynn, Brigitte Bardot
The Decadent Influence (Une fille et des fusils, a.k.a. To Be a Crook), directed by Claude Lelouch – (France)
A Devilish Homicide (Salinma) – (South Korea)
Die! Die! My Darling! (a.k.a. Fanatic), starring Tallulah Bankhead and Stefanie Powers
 Dingaka, starring Stanley Baker – (South Africa)
 Do Not Disturb, starring Doris Day and Rod Taylor
Doctor Zhivago, directed by David Lean, starring Omar Sharif, Julie Christie, Geraldine Chaplin, Rod Steiger, Alec Guinness—winner of 5 Academy Awards – (U.K.)
The Dolls (Le bambole), starring Nino Manfredi, Monica Vitti, Elke Sommer and Gina Lollobrigida – (Italy)
Dr. Goldfoot and the Bikini Machine, starring Vincent Price and Frankie Avalon
Dr. Terror's House of Horrors, starring Peter Cushing and Christopher Lee – (U.K.)
Dr. Who and the Daleks, starring Peter Cushing – (U.K.)

E
The Early Bird, starring Norman Wisdom – (U.K.)
The Eleanor Roosevelt Story, a documentary directed by Richard Kaplan
Eric Soya's "17" (Sytten), starring Ole Søltoft and Ghita Nørby – (Denmark)

F 
The Face of Fu Manchu, directed by Don Sharp and starring Christopher Lee – (U.K./West Germany)
The Family Jewels, starring Jerry Lewis
Fantômas se déchaîne (Fantômas Unleashed), starring Jean Marais – (France)
Faster, Pussycat! Kill! Kill!, directed by Russ Meyer
Ferry Cross the Mersey, starring Gerry and the Pacemakers – (U.K.)
Film, written by Samuel Beckett and directed by Alan Schneider
Fists in the Pocket (I pugni in tasca) – (Italy)
The Flight of the Phoenix, directed by Robert Aldrich, starring James Stewart, Richard Attenborough, Hardy Krüger, Ernest Borgnine, Peter Finch
For a Few Dollars More, directed by Sergio Leone, starring Clint Eastwood – (Italy)
Frankenstein Conquers the World (Furankenshutain tai Baragon), directed by Ishirō Honda – (Japan)
Funny Things Happen Down Under, starring Olivia Newton-John – (Australia)

G
Il Gaucho, starring Vittorio Gassman and Nino Manfredi – (Italy/Argentina)
Gendarme in New York (Le gendarme à New York), starring Louis de Funès – (France/Italy/U.S.)
Genghis Khan, starring Omar Sharif, Stephen Boyd and James Mason
Girl Happy, starring Elvis Presley
The Girls on the Beach, directed by William N. Witney, starring Noreen Corcoran and Martin West
The Glory Guys, directed by Arnold Laven, starring Tom Tryon and Harve Presnell
Goldstein, comedy ensemble film, with actors from The Second City, including Severn Darden
The Great Race, directed by Blake Edwards, starring Tony Curtis, Jack Lemmon, Natalie Wood, Peter Falk, Ross Martin
The Great Sioux Massacre, directed by Sidney Salkow and starring Joseph Cotten, Darren McGavin and Philip Carey
The Greatest Story Ever Told, directed by George Stevens, starring Max von Sydow, Charlton Heston, Dorothy McGuire, David McCallum, Martin Landau, Telly Savalas
Guide, directed by Vijay Anand, starring Dev Anand – (India)
Gumnaam (Unknown), starring Manoj Kumar – (India)

H
The Hallelujah Trail, directed by John Sturges, starring Burt Lancaster, Lee Remick, Jim Hutton, Pamela Tiffin
Hands of a Gunfighter (Ocaso de un pistolero / Il destino di un pistolero), directed by Rafael Romero Marchent – (Italy/Spain)
Happiness (Le bonheur), directed by Agnès Varda – (France)
Harlow, starring Carroll Baker, Peter Lawford, Red Buttons, Mike Connors, Leslie Nielsen, Angela Lansbury
Harlow, starring Carol Lynley, Efrem Zimbalist, Jr., Barry Sullivan, Hurd Hatfield, Ginger Rogers
Harum Scarum, aka Harem Holiday, starring Elvis Presley, Mary Ann Mobley, Fran Jeffries
Harvey Middleman, Fireman, written and directed by Ernest Pintoff
Help!, directed by Richard Lester, starring the Beatles – (U.K.)
The Heroes of Telemark, starring Kirk Douglas and Richard Harris
A High Wind in Jamaica, starring Anthony Quinn and James Coburn – (U.K.)
The Hill, directed by Sidney Lumet, starring Sean Connery, Ian Bannen, Ossie Davis – (U.K.)
The Hour and Turn of Augusto Matraga (A Hora e a Vez de Augusto Matraga) – (Brazil)
How to Murder Your Wife, starring Jack Lemmon and Virna Lisi
How to Stuff a Wild Bikini, starring Annette Funicello, Dwayne Hickman, Buster Keaton, Beverly Adams, Mickey Rooney

I
I, a Woman (Jeg - en kvinde), directed by Mac Ahlberg – (Denmark/Sweden)
I Knew Her Well (Io la conoscevo bene), starring Stefania Sandrelli, Nino Manfredi, Franco Nero – (Italy)
I'll Take Sweden, starring Bob Hope, Dina Merrill, Frankie Avalon, Tuesday Weld
Impossible on Saturday (Pas question le samedi) – (Italy/France/Israel)
In Harm's Way, directed by Otto Preminger, starring John Wayne, Kirk Douglas, Patricia Neal, Brandon deWilde, Paula Prentiss, Henry Fonda
Inside Daisy Clover, starring Natalie Wood, Robert Redford, Christopher Plummer
Inside the Forbidden City (Song gong mi shi) – (Hong Kong)
Intimate Lighting (Intimní osvětlení), directed by Ivan Passer – (Czechoslovakia)
Invasion of Astro-Monster (Kaijû daisensô), directed by Ishirō Honda – (Japan)
The Ipcress File, directed by Sidney J. Furie, starring Michael Caine – BAFTA Award for Best British Film – (U.K.)
I Saw What You Did, starring Joan Crawford

J
John Goldfarb, Please Come Home!, starring Shirley MacLaine, Richard Crenna, Peter Ustinov
Joy in the Morning, starring Richard Chamberlain and Yvette Mimieux
Juliet of the Spirits (Giulietta degli spiriti), directed by Federico Fellini – (Italy/France)

K
King Rat, starring George Segal, Tom Courtenay and James Fox
The Knack ...and How to Get It, directed by Richard Lester and starring Rita Tushingham – (U.K.)

L
The Lace Wars (Les fêtes galantes), directed by René Clair – (France/Romania)
Lady L, directed by Peter Ustinov, starring Sophia Loren, Paul Newman and David Niven
Laurel and Hardy's Laughing 20's, a retrospective film directed by Robert Youngson
Licensed to Kill, starring Tom Adams – (U.K.)
Life at the Top, starring Laurence Harvey and Jean Simmons – (U.K.)
The Liquidator, directed by Jack Cardiff, starring Rod Taylor and Trevor Howard (U.K.)
La Loba (The She-Wolf) – (Mexico)
Lord Jim, starring Peter O'Toole – (UK/US)
Love and Kisses, starring Rick Nelson
The Love Goddesses, a documentary directed by Saul J. Turell
Love Has Many Faces, starring Lana Turner, Hugh O'Brian and Cliff Robertson
Love Meetings, a documentary by Pier Paolo Pasolini – (Italy)
The Loved One, directed by Tony Richardson, starring Robert Morse and Jonathan Winters
Loves of a Blonde (Lásky jedné plavovlásky), directed by Miloš Forman – (Czechoslovakia)

M
A Maiden for a Prince (Una vergine per il principe), starring Virna Lisi and Vittorio Gassman – (Italy)
Major Dundee, directed by Sam Peckinpah, starring Charlton Heston, Richard Harris, James Coburn, Jim Hutton
The Man from Button Willow
Man Is Not a Bird (Čovek nije tica) – (Yugoslavia)
Marco the Magnificent (La fabuleuse aventure de Marco Polo), directed by Denys de La Patellière and Noël Howard – (Multiple countries)
Marriage on the Rocks, starring Frank Sinatra, Dean Martin and Deborah Kerr
Marvelous Angelique (Merveilleuse Angélique), directed by Bernard Borderie – (France/Italy/West Germany)
McHale's Navy Joins the Air Force
Mickey One, directed by Arthur Penn, starring Warren Beatty
Mirage, directed by Edward Dmytryk, starring Gregory Peck, Diane Baker and Walter Matthau
Mister Moses, directed by Ronald Neame and starring Robert Mitchum and Carroll Baker
The Moment of Truth (Il momento della verità), directed by Francesco Rosi – (Italy)
The Money Trap, starring Glenn Ford, Rita Hayworth, Ricardo Montalbán, Joseph Cotten, Elke Sommer
The Monkey's Uncle, starring Annette Funicello and Tommy Kirk
Morituri, starring Marlon Brando and Yul Brynner
Mozambique, directed by Robert Lynn – (U.K./West Germany)
My Baby Is Black! (Les lâches vivent d'espoir), 1961 French film released in the U.S. in 1965 – (France)

N
The Nanny, starring Bette Davis – (U.K.)
 The Naked Prey, directed by and starring Cornel Wilde – (U.S./South Africa)
Never Too Late, starring Paul Ford, Maureen O'Sullivan, Connie Stevens, Jim Hutton
Nightmare Castle, starring Barbara Steele – (Italy)
Nightmare in the Sun, starring Ursula Andress, John Derek, Aldo Ray and Sammy Davis, Jr.
Ninety Degrees in the Shade (Třicet jedna ve stínu), directed by Jiří Weiss – (U.K./Czechoslovakia)
None but the Brave, directed by and starring Frank Sinatra, with Clint Walker and Tommy Sands

O
Once a Thief, starring Alain Delon and Ann-Margret – (United States/France)
One Way Pendulum, directed by Peter Yates – (U.K.)
Operation C.I.A., starring Burt Reynolds and Danielle Aubry
Operation Crossbow, starring Sophia Loren – (U.K.)
Operation Y and Shurik's Other Adventures (Operatsiya „Y“ i drugie priklyucheniya Shurika), starring Aleksandr Demyanenko – (U.S.S.R.)
OSS 117–Mission for a Killer (Furia à Bahia pour OSS 117), directed by André Hunebelle and starring Frederick Stafford – (France)
Othello, directed by Stuart Burge, starring Laurence Olivier, Maggie Smith, Frank Finlay – (U.K.)

P
Pandora and the Magic Box, directed by Joseph W. Sarno
Paris Secret, a documentary directed by Edouard Logereau
A Patch of Blue, starring Sidney Poitier, Elizabeth Hartman, Shelley Winters
Pierrot le Fou, directed by Jean-Luc Godard, starring Jean-Paul Belmondo and Anna Karina – (France)
Pinocchio in Outer Space, produced and directed by Ray Goossens – (U.S./Belgium)
A Pistol for Ringo (Una pistola per Ringo), directed by Duccio Tessari
Planet of the Vampires (Terrore nello spazio), directed by Mario Bava – (Italy/Spain)
The Possessed (La donna del lago), directed by Luigi Bazzoni and Franco Rossellini – (Italy)
Promise Her Anything, directed by Arthur Hiller, starring Warren Beatty and Leslie Caron

R
The Rabbit Is Me (Das Kaninchen bin ich) – (East Germany)
A Rage to Live, directed by Walter Grauman and starring Suzanne Pleshette
The Railroad Man (Il ferroviere), directed by Pietro Germi – (Italy)
The Railrodder, a comedy short starring Buster Keaton in his last film – (Canada)
Rapture (La fleur de l'âge), directed by John Guillermin, starring Melvyn Douglas, Patricia Gozzi and Dean Stockwell – (France/U.S.)
Răscoala, directed by Mircea Mureșan – (Romania)
Red Beard (Akahige), directed by Akira Kurosawa, starring Toshiro Mifune – (Japan)
Red Line 7000, directed by Howard Hawks and starring James Caan
Repulsion, directed by Roman Polanski, starring Catherine Deneuve – (U.K.)
Return from the Ashes, starring Maximilian Schell and Samantha Eggar
The Return of Mr. Moto, starring Henry Silva – (U.K.)
The Return of Ringo (Il ritorno di Ringo), directed by Duccio Tessari
Rotten to the Core, directed by John Boulting – (U.K.)
The Rounders, directed by Burt Kennedy, starring Glenn Ford and Henry Fonda

S
Samurai Spy (Ibun Sarutobi Sasuke) – (Japan)
Sandra (Vaghe stelle dell'Orsa), directed by Luchino Visconti, starring Claudia Cardinale – (Italy)
São Paulo, Sociedade Anônima (São Paulo, the Anonymous Town) – (Brazil)
The Saragossa Manuscript (Rekopis znaleziony w Saragossie), starring Zbigniew Cybulski – (Poland)
The Sandpiper, directed by Vincente Minnelli, starring Elizabeth Taylor, Richard Burton and Eva Marie Saint
Sands of the Kalahari, starring Stuart Whitman, Stanley Baker, Susannah York – (U.K.)
The Satan Bug, starring George Maharis and Anne Francis
Secrets Behind the Wall (Kabe no naka no himegoto) – (Japan)
Sergeant Deadhead, starring Frankie Avalon and Deborah Walley
 Shadows of Forgotten Ancestors (Tini zabutykh predkiv) – (U.S.S.R.)
Shakespeare Wallah, directed by James Ivory, starring Shashi Kapoor, Felicity Kendal, Madhur Jaffrey
The Shameless Old Lady (La vieille dame indigne), directed by René Allio – (France)
She, starring Ursula Andress and Peter Cushing – (U.K.)
Shenandoah, starring James Stewart, Doug McClure, Rosemary Forsyth, Katharine Ross
Ship of Fools, directed by Stanley Kramer, starring Vivien Leigh, Simone Signoret, Lee Marvin, Michael Dunn, José Ferrer
The Shop on Main Street (Obchod na korze), directed by Ján Kadár and Elmar Klos (Czechoslovakia)
Simon of the Desert (Simón del desierto), directed by Luis Buñuel – (Mexico)
The Sin (Al Haram) – (Egypt)
Situation Hopeless... But Not Serious, starring Alec Guinness, Mike Connors, Robert Redford
Ski Party, starring Frankie Avalon and Yvonne Craig
The Skull, starring Peter Cushing, Christopher Lee, Patrick Wymark – (U.K.)
Slalom, starring Vittorio Gassman, Adolfo Celi, Beba Lončar, Daniela Bianchi – (Italy)
The Sleeping Car Murders (Compartiment tueurs), directed by Costa-Gavras, starring Yves Montand and Simone Signoret – (France)
The Slender Thread, directed by Sydney Pollack, starring Sidney Poitier, Anne Bancroft, Telly Savalas and Ed Asner
The Sons of Katie Elder, directed by Henry Hathaway, starring John Wayne and Dean Martin
The Sound of Music, directed by Robert Wise, starring Julie Andrews and Christopher Plummer
The Spy Who Came in from the Cold, directed by Martin Ritt, starring Richard Burton and Claire Bloom – (U.K.)
Sting of Death, directed by William Grefe
Story of a Prostitute (Shunpuden), directed by Seijun Suzuki – (Japan)
Strange Bedfellows, starring Rock Hudson and Gina Lollobrigida
A Study in Terror (British), a Sherlock Holmes mystery directed by James Hill, starring John Neville as Holmes, Donald Houston as Watson, and Anthony Quayle- (U.K.)
A Swingin' Summer, starring James Stacy and Raquel Welch
Sword of the Beast (Kedamono no ken), directed by Hideo Gosha – (Japan)
Sylvia, starring Carroll Baker and George Maharis
Synanon, directed by Richard Quine, starring Edmond O'Brien, Chuck Connors, Stella Stevens

T
Tattooed Life (Irezumi ichidai), directed by Seijun Suzuki – (Japan)
Ten Little Indians, starring Shirley Eaton, Hugh O'Brian, Daliah Lavi, Stanley Holloway, Wilfred Hyde-White, Fabian Forte – (U.K.)
That Darn Cat! starring Dean Jones
That Funny Feeling, starring Bobby Darin and Sandra Dee
That Man in Istanbul, directed by Antonio Isasi-Isasmendi and starring Horst Buchholz – (France/Italy/Spain)
The Third Day, starring George Peppard and Elizabeth Ashley
Thirty Three (Tridtsat tri) – (U.S.S.R.)
Those Magnificent Men in Their Flying Machines, directed by Ken Annakin, starring Stuart Whitman, Sarah Miles, Robert Morley, Gert Fröbe – (U.K.)
A Thousand Clowns, starring Jason Robards, Barry Gordon, Martin Balsam, Barbara Harris
Thunderball, starring Sean Connery (as James Bond), with Claudine Auger, Luciana Paluzzi, Adolfo Celi – (U.K.)
Tickle Me, starring Elvis Presley
Tokyo Olympiad, a documentary directed by Kon Ichikawa – (Japan)
Town Tamer, directed by Lesley Selander and starring Dana Andrews
The Truth About Spring, directed by Richard Thorpe, starring Hayley Mills and John Mills
Two on a Guillotine, directed by William Conrad and starring Connie Stevens

U
The Uninhibited (Los pianos mecánicos), directed by Juan Antonio Bardem, starring Melina Mercouri and James Mason – (Spain)
Up from the Beach, starring Cliff Robertson
Up to His Ears (Les tribulations d'un chinois en chine), starring Jean Paul Belmondo and Ursula Andress – (France)

V
A Very Special Favor, starring Rock Hudson and Leslie Caron
Victim Five, directed by Robert Lynn – (U.K.)
Viva Maria!, directed by Louis Malle, starring Brigitte Bardot and Jeanne Moreau – (France)
Von Ryan's Express, directed by Mark Robson, starring Frank Sinatra, Trevor Howard, Edward Mulhare, Adolfo Celi
Voyage to the Prehistoric Planet, starring Basil Rathbone

W
Waqt, starring Sunil Dutt and Sadhana – (India)
The War Game, a TV docudrama directed by Peter Watkins – (U.K.)
The War Lord, starring Charlton Heston, Richard Boone, Rosemary Forsyth
What's New Pussycat?, directed by Clive Donner, starring Peter Sellers, Peter O'Toole, Woody Allen, Romy Schneider, Paula Prentiss, Capucine
Who Killed Teddy Bear, starring Sal Mineo, Juliet Prowse and Elaine Stritch
Wild on the Beach, starring Sherry Jackson, Frankie Randall, Sonny & Cher
Willy McBean and His Magic Machine, stop-motion film produced by Arthur Rankin, Jr. and Videocraft International
Winter Kept Us Warm, directed by David Secter – (Canada)
The World of Abbott and Costello, starring Bud Abbott and Lou Costello

Y
Yo Yo, directed by and starring Pierre Étaix – (France)
You Must Be Joking!, starring Lionel Jeffries, Denholm Elliott, Michael Callan – (U.K.)
Young Cassidy, directed by Jack Cardiff and John Ford – (U.K.)
Young Dillinger, starring Nick Adams and Mary Ann Mobley

Z 

 Zatoichi and the Chess Expert (Zatōichi jigoku-tabi), directed by Kenji Misumi – (Japan)
 Zatoichi and the Doomed Man (Zatōichi sakate-giri), directed by Kazuo Mori – (Japan)

Short film series
Looney Tunes (1930–1969)
Merrie Melodies (1931–1969)
Speedy Gonzales (1953–1968)
Goofy (1965)

Births
January 3 – Jens Albinus, Danish actor
January 4
Yvan Attal, French actor, scriptwriter and director
Julia Ormond, English actress
January 5 - Vinnie Jones, British actor, producer and singer
January 8 - Michelle Forbes, American actress
January 9 – Joely Richardson, English actress
January 15 – James Nesbitt, Northern Irish actor
January 22
Diane Lane, American actress
Brian McCardie, Scottish actor and writer
January 24 - Carlos Saldanha, Brazilian animator, director, producer and voice actor
January 27 – Alan Cumming, Scottish actor
January 28 - Lynda Boyd, Canadian actress, singer, musician and writer
January 31 - Matt McColm, American actor and stuntman
February 1 – Brandon Lee, American actor (d. 1993)
February 3 – Maura Tierney, American actress
February 7 – Chris Rock, American actor and comedian
February 9
Darren Dalton, American actor, screenwriter and producer
Keith Wickham, British voice actor, comedian and screenwriter
February 12 - Christine Elise, American actress
February 13 - Andy Buckley, American actor
February 17 - Michael Bay, American director and producer
February 18 – Dr. Dre, American music producer
February 20 - Ron Eldard, American actor
February 23 – Kristin Davis, American actress
February 27 - Noah Emmerich, American actor and director
March 4 - Stacy Edwards, American actress
March 9
Mike Pollock (voice actor), American voice actor and former radio personality
Coolie Ranx, British-Jamaican actor and singer
March 13 - Steve Bacic, Canadian actor
March 14 – Aamir Khan, Indian actor
March 18 - Yul Vazquez, Cuban-American actor and musician
March 23
Peter Jacobson, American actor
Wayne Péré, American character actor
March 25 – Sarah Jessica Parker, American actress
March 31 – Steve Bing, American businessman, philanthropist and film producer (d. 2020)
April 1 - José Zúñiga, Honduran-American actor
April 3 - Angela Featherstone, actress and writer
April 4 – Robert Downey, Jr., American actor
April 9 - Mark Pellegrino, American actor
April 11 - Lynn Ferguson, Scottish writer and actress
April 16
Jon Cryer, American actor
Martin Lawrence, Canadian-American actor and comedian
April 17
William Mapother, American actor
Catherine Russell (British actress), British actress
April 22 - Roman Coppola, American filmmaker, screenwriter, producer
April 25 - John Henson (puppeteer), American puppeteer (d. 2014)
April 26 – Kevin James, American actor and comedian
April 30 - Adrian Pasdar, American actor and voice artist
May 2 - Ari Lehman, American actor
May 10 - Kiyoyuki Yanada, Japanese voice actor (d. 2022)
May 16 - Vincent Regan, British actor
May 19 - Mikhail Gorevoy, Russian actor
May 23 – Liina Tennosaar, Estonian actress 
May 24 – John C. Reilly, American actor and comedian
May 27 – Zenobia Shroff, Indian-American actress and comedienne
May 31
Jeremy Hotz, Canadian-American actor and stand-up comedian
Brooke Shields, American actress and model
June 1 - Andrew Havill, English actor
June 8 - Frank Grillo, American actor
June 10 – Elizabeth Hurley, English model and actress
June 18 – Kim Dickens, American actress
June 19 – Sean Marshall, American child actor and singer
June 22 - J. J. Cohen, American actor
June 24 - Richard Lumsden, English actor, writer, composer and musician
June 28 – Sonny Strait, American voice actor
July 3
Tommy Flanagan (actor), Scottish actor
Connie Nielsen, Danish actress
July 4 - Gérard Watkins, English-French actor, playwright, director and screenwriter
July 8
Corey Parker (actor), American actor and acting coach
Lee Tergesen, American actor
July 9 - David O'Hara, Scottish character actor
July 11
Liane Curtis, American actress and musician
Pamela Gidley, American actress and model (d. 2018)
July 13 - Eric Freeman (actor), American actor
July 14 - Bibo Bergeron, French animator and director
July 16 - Daryl Mitchell (actor), American actor and rapper
July 17 - Alex Winter, British-born American director, writer and actor
July 24 - Doug Liman, American director and producer
July 25 – Illeana Douglas, American actress
July 26 – Jeremy Piven, American actor
August 1 - Sam Mendes, British director, producer and screenwriter
August 4 - James Tupper, Canadian actor
August 6 - De'voreaux White, American actor
August 10 - Claudia Christian, American actress and singer
August 11
Embeth Davidtz, American-South African actress
Viola Davis, American actress
August 12 - Peter Krause, American actor, director and producer
August 16 - Brian McCann (actor), American actor, comedian and writer
August 18 - Ikue Ōtani, Japanese actress, singer, voice actress and narrator
August 19
Kevin Dillon, American actor
Kyra Sedgwick, American actress
August 22 - Courtney Gains, American actor
August 24 – Marlee Matlin, American actress
August 25 - Kim Kold, Danish actor
August 31 - Daniel Bernhardt, Swiss actor, model and martial artist
September 3 – Charlie Sheen, American actor
September 6 - John Polson, Australian actor and director
September 9 - Constance Marie, American actress
September 13 - Jeff Ross, American stand-up comedian and actor
September 15 - Joe Chrest, American academic and actor
September 17 
Bryan Singer, American director, producer and screenwriter
Kyle Chandler, American actor
September 21
Cheryl Hines, American actress, comedian and director
David Wenham, Australian actor
September 25 - Gordon Currie (actor), Canadian-American actor
September 30 - Omid Djalili, British stand-up comedian, actor, television producer, voice actor and writer of Iranian descent
October 8
Peter Greene, American actor
Burr Steers, American actor, screenwriter and director
October 10
Chris Penn, American actor (d. 2006)
Rebecca Pidgeon, American actress, singer and songwriter
October 11
Lennie James, English actor
Ivo Uukkivi, Estonian actor, singer and television producer 
October 14 – Steve Coogan, English actor
October 18 - Ralph Eggleston, American animator, art director, storyboard artist, writer, director and production designer (d. 2022)
October 19 – Merle Jääger, Estonian actress and poet 
October 20 – William Zabka, American actor
October 25 – Mathieu Amalric, French actor and filmmaker
October 28 - Jami Gertz, American actress
October 31 - Rob Rackstraw, British voice actor
November 2 – Shah Rukh Khan, Indian actor
November 19 - Paul Weitz (filmmaker), American filmmaker and actor
November 21 – Alexander Siddig, Sudanese-English actor
November 22 - Mads Mikkelsen, Danish actor
November 24 – Shirley Henderson, Scottish actress
November 25 - Dougray Scott, Scottish actor
November 26 - Scott Adsit, American actor, comedian and writer
November 30
Ben Stiller, American actor
Andrew Tiernan, British actor and director
December 2 - Beatrice Macola, Italian actress (d. 2001)
December 3 - Andrew Stanton, American animator, director, screenwriter, producer and voice actor
December 7 – Jeffrey Wright, American actor
December 14 - Ted Raimi, American character actor, director, comedian and writer
December 16 – J.B. Smoove, American actor and comedian
December 19 - Jessica Steen, Canadian actress
December 21 – Andy Dick, American comedian, actor, musician and television and film producer
December 27 – Salman Khan, Indian actor
December 31 – Gong Li, Chinese actress

Deaths
January 14 – Jeanette MacDonald, 61, American actress, singer, San Francisco, One Hour with You
February 5 – Irving Bacon, 71, American actor, Meet John Doe, Fort Ti
February 10 – Arnold Manoff, 50, American screenwriter, No Minor Vices, Casbah
February 15 – Nat King Cole, 45, American singer and actor, St. Louis Blues, Istanbul
February 23 – Stan Laurel, 74, British actor, The Flying Deuces, Sons of the Desert
 March 1 – Fred Immler, 84, German actor, Madame Du Barry, Zapata's Gang
March 6 – Margaret Dumont, 82, American actress, Duck Soup, A Night at the Opera
March 8 – Esther Howard, 72, American actress, The Big Noise, Detour
March 23 – Mae Murray, 79, American actress, The Merry Widow, The Delicious Little Devil
March 28
Clemence Dane, 77, British screenwriter, Anna Karenina, Perfect Strangers
Jack Hoxie, 80, American Western actor, The Last Frontier, Gold
April 1 – Edna Tichenor, 64, American actress, London After Midnight, The Show 
April 3 – Ray Enright, 69, American director, Alibi Ike, The Spoilers
April 8 – Lars Hanson, 78, Swedish actor, The Wind, Flesh and the Devil
April 10 – Linda Darnell, 41, American actress, My Darling Clementine, The Mark of Zorro
April 24 – Louise Dresser, 85, American actress, A Ship Comes In, The Scarlet Empress
April 30 – Helen Chandler, 59, American actress, Dracula, The Last Flight
5 May – John Waters, 71, screenwriter and director, The Big Country, The Desperate Hours
June 6 – Lech Owron, 71, Polish actor, Vampires of Warsaw, The Little Eagle
June 7 – Judy Holliday, 43, American actress, Born Yesterday, Bells Are Ringing
June 8 – Florence Ryerson, 72, American screenwriter, The Wizard of Oz, The Ice Follies of 1939
June 15 – Steve Cochran, 48, American actor, The Best Years of Our Lives, White Heat
June 22 – David O. Selznick, 63, American producer, Gone with the Wind, Rebecca
June 23 – Mary Boland, 85, American stage and film actress, The Women, Ruggles of Red Gap
June 27 – Anthony Veiller, 62, American screenwriter, The Stranger, The Killers
July 11 – Ray Collins, 78, American actor, Citizen Kane, The Kid from Left Field
July 19 – Clyde Beatty, 62, American actor and animal trainer, Africa Screams, Ring of Fear
July 24 – Constance Bennett, 60, American actress, Topper, Merrily We Live
July 28 – Minor Watson, 75, American actor, Woman of the Year, The Jackie Robinson Story
August 6 
Everett Sloane, 55, American actor, Citizen Kane, The Lady from Shanghai
Nancy Carroll, 61, American actress, The Devil's Holiday, Hot Saturday
August 30 – Pauline Garon, 64, Canadian actress, The Heart of Broadway, The College Hero
September 2 – Felix E. Feist, 55, American director, This Woman Is Dangerous, The Big Trees
September 4 – Isabel Jeans, 93, British actress, Suspicion, Gigi
September 7
 Catherine Dale Owen, 70, American actress, Such Men Are Dangerous, Born Reckless
 Jean Peyrière, 79, French actor, Le roi de Paris, Fanfan la Tulipe 
September 8 – Dorothy Dandridge, 42, American actress, singer, Carmen Jones, Porgy and Bess
September 27 – Clara Bow, 60, American actress, Wings, It
September 29 – Eddie Gribbon, 75, American film actor, brother of Harry Gribbon
October 3 – Zachary Scott, 51, American actor, Mildred Pierce, The Southerner
October 6 – Tom Kennedy, 80, American actor, Petticoat Larceny, Bringing Up Father
October 18 – Henry Travers, 91, British actor, It's a Wonderful Life, Shadow of a Doubt
October 21 – Marie McDonald, 42, American actress, The Geisha Boy, Living in a Big Way
October 23 – Janice Logan, 50, American actress, Dr. Cyclops, Opened by Mistake
October 31 – Rita Johnson, 52, American actress, Here Comes Mr. Jordan, The Major and the Minor
November 14 – Russell Collins, 68, American actor, Miss Sadie Thompson, Bad Day at Black Rock
November 26 – Wild Bill Elliott, 61, American actor, The San Antonio Kid, Sudden Danger
December 5 – Joseph I. Breen, 77, chief administrator of the Motion Picture Production Code of 1930 (Hays Code) from 1934 to 1954
December 22 – Albert Ritz, 64, American entertainer of the Ritz Brothers, Sing, Baby, Sing, Life Begins in College
December 29 – Frank S. Nugent, 57, American screenwriter, The Searchers, She Wore a Yellow Ribbon

Film debuts
Ian Abercrombie – Von Ryan's Express
Woody Allen – What's New Pussycat
Paul Benedict – The Double-Barrelled Detective Story
Jane Birkin – The Knack ...and How to Get It
Jacqueline Bisset – The Knack ...and How to Get It
Dabney Coleman – The Slender Thread
Robert De Niro – Three Rooms in Manhattan
Charles Durning – Harvey Middleman, Fireman
Michael Gambon – Othello
Giancarlo Giannini – Libido
Timothy Hutton – Never Too Late
Derek Jacobi – Othello
James Karen – Frankenstein Meets the Space Monster
Philip Kaufman (director) – Goldstein
George Lucas (director) – Look at Life
Sandra Peabody – Misfit
Alex Rocco – Motorpsycho
Katharine Ross – Shenandoah
Abe Vigoda – Three Rooms in Manhattan
Sam Waterston – The Plastic Dome of Norma Jean
Paul Williams – The Loved One

References

 
Film by year